Matthew Temple (born 20 June 1999) is an Australian swimmer. He is the Oceanian record and Australian record holder in the long course 100 metre butterfly with a time of 50.45 seconds. He competed in the men's 200 metre butterfly at the 2019 World Aquatics Championships, placing 10th in his semi final. At the 2020 Summer Olympics, he placed fifth in the 100 metre butterfly with a time of 50.92 seconds in the final.

Temple achieved qualifying times for the 2022 World Aquatics Championships and 2022 Commonwealth Games in the 100 metre butterfly at the 2022 Australian Swimming Championships, held in Adelaide in May, winning the event 0.17 seconds ahead of second-place finisher Kyle Chalmers with a time of 51.50 seconds.

At the 2022 Australian Short Course Swimming Championships, held in August in Sydney, Temple won the gold medal in the 50 metre butterfly, with a personal best time of 22.70 seconds, and the 100 metre butterfly, with a 50.09, and the bronze medal in the 100 metre freestyle with a time of 46.80 seconds.

World records

Short course metres

 split 48.34 (butterfly leg); with Isaac Cooper (backstroke leg), Joshua Yong (breaststroke leg), Kyle Chalmers (freestyle leg)

References

External links
 

1999 births
Australian male butterfly swimmers
Living people
Australian male freestyle swimmers
Place of birth missing (living people)
World Aquatics Championships medalists in swimming
Medalists at the FINA World Swimming Championships (25 m)
Medalists at the 2020 Summer Olympics
Olympic bronze medalists for Australia
Swimmers at the 2020 Summer Olympics
Olympic swimmers of Australia
Olympic bronze medalists in swimming
Swimmers at the 2022 Commonwealth Games
Commonwealth Games medallists in swimming
Commonwealth Games gold medallists for Australia
Commonwealth Games silver medallists for Australia
21st-century Australian people
Medallists at the 2022 Commonwealth Games